is a Japanese nurse, who was convicted for giving lethal doses of the muscle relaxant drug vecuronium to his patients in a clinic in Izumi-ku, Sendai, Miyagi Prefecture. Although he was convicted of only one murder, he is suspected to be a medical serial killer.

Mori was suspected of a murder of 89-year-old woman Yukiko Shimoyama on November 24, 2000. He was also suspected of four attempted murders; a 1-year-old girl on 2 February 2000, an 11-year-old girl on 31 October 2000, a four-year-old boy on 13 November 2000 and a 45-year-old man on 24 November 2000. He was arrested on January 6, 2001.

When he was arrested, he was reported to have murdered at least 10 people. However, he insisted on his innocence four days after his arrest. There were also many problems and mysterious deaths in his hospital, so his lawyers insisted that he was accused as their substitute. The U.S. newsmagazine Time criticized Japanese hospitals as well as him.

The district court in Sendai sentenced him to life imprisonment on March 30, 2004 for one murder and four attempted murders. Japanese police insisted that vecuronium's molecular mass is 258, but its correct molecular mass is 557. His defense pointed out this contradiction on the high court, but the high court in Sendai upheld the original sentence on March 22, 2006. He appealed to Supreme Court, which upheld the sentence on February 25, 2008.

Books
Boku wa yatte nai (Daisuke Mori, 2001)

See also
 List of serial killers by number of victims

References

External links
Very Questionable Care Time, January 22, 2001
Crime Library. Angels of death: The Male Nurses -- Farther East
 Timeline Japan Institute of Constitutional Law
 Data base of wrongful convictions in Japan

Newspaper articles, chronology and present status of the appeal is available at:
 http://www.jiadep.org/Hokuriku_Clinic.html

1971 births
Japanese nurses
Japanese people convicted of murder
Japanese prisoners sentenced to life imprisonment
Male nurses
Nurses convicted of killing patients
Living people
People convicted of murder by Japan
Prisoners sentenced to life imprisonment by Japan
Suspected serial killers